Jort Kelder (born 22 September 1964) is a Dutch journalist, television presenter and former editor of the magazine Quote.

In the 2018-2019 season, he presented the Sunday discussion program Buitenhof for AVROTROS as a replacement for Pieter Jan Hagens; in 2019 he was the presenter on behalf of the VPRO, until a successor was found for Diana Matroos. Kelder presented various television programs which include Hoe heurt het eigenlijk? and Bij ons in de PC. As of August 2019, he is one of the presenters of Buitenhof. He also presents the show Dr. Kelder & co on radio. On May 29, 2020, it was announced that Kelder had won the sixth edition of the Pim Fortuyn Prize.

Personal life 

Kelder was previously in relationships with Georgina Verbaan and Lauren Verster.

References

External links 

 

1964 births
Living people
Dutch television presenters
Dutch journalists
Dutch magazine editors